Bozenna Janina Pasik-Duncan (born 1947) is a Polish-American mathematician who works as a professor of mathematics at the University of Kansas.

Research
Pasik-Duncan's research concerns stochastic control and its applications in communications, economics, and health science. She is also interested in mathematics education, particularly for women in STEM fields.

Education and career
Pasik-Duncan attended high school in Radom. She earned a master's degree in mathematics from the University of Warsaw in 1970. She completed a Ph.D. at the Warsaw School of Economics in 1978, and earned a habilitation there in 1986.

She moved to the University of Kansas mathematics department in 1984, joining there her husband Tyrone Duncan (also a University of Kansas mathematician).

Recognition
She was a recipient of the IEEE's Third Millennium Medal in 2000, and became a Fellow of the IEEE in 2001. She was the 2004 AWM/MAA Falconer Lecturer, and the 2004 winner of the Louise Hay Award for Contributions to Mathematics Education of the Association for Women in Mathematics. She was named a Fellow of the International Federation of Automatic Control in 2014. Pasik-Duncan was selected as a Fellow of the Association for Women in Mathematics in the Class of 2021 "for her decades of contributions: as a founder and sustainer of the Women in Control Committee of the IEEE Control Systems Society; as the chair of IFAC’s Task Force on Diversity and Inclusion; and via other programs and activities to support and encourage women and girls in mathematics and engineering".

References

1947 births
Living people
20th-century American mathematicians
21st-century American mathematicians
American women mathematicians
Polish mathematicians
Polish women mathematicians
Control theorists
University of Warsaw alumni
SGH Warsaw School of Economics alumni
University of Kansas faculty
Fellow Members of the IEEE
Fellows of the International Federation of Automatic Control
20th-century women mathematicians
21st-century women mathematicians
Fellows of the Association for Women in Mathematics
20th-century American women
21st-century American women